Steve Gravers (born Solomon Gottlieb; April 8, 1922, New York City – died August 22, 1978, Studio City, California) was an American character actor who appeared in numerous television shows and several films in a career that lasted from 1952 until his death in 1978.

Career
A life member of The Actors Studio, Gravers made his Broadway debut in the Studio's production of Michael Gazzo's A Hatful of Rain on November 9, 1955.

This was the same night on which Graver's first featured television performance was aired, a guest appearance on I Spy (not the popular hour-long series which would debut a decade later, but rather a half-hour anthology series hosted/narrated in character by Raymond Massey, as 'Anton the spymaster'), in an episode entitled "Bits and Pieces".

Personal life

Gravers married actress Vitina Marcus, with whom he had two children; the couple divorced in 1960. Gravers lived in California until his death on August 22, 1978 from lung cancer in Studio City, California.

Selected credits

Films

 Al Capone (1959) - Albert Anselmi
 Hell Bent for Leather (1960) - Grover
 Operation Eichmann (1961) - Jacob
 40 Pounds of Trouble (1962) - Daytime
 The Satan Bug (1965) - 2nd Fake SDI Agent (uncredited)
 Across 110th Street (1972) - Tailor Shop Patrolman
 Blood Sabbath (1972) - The Padre
 Wizards (1977) - Blackwolf (voice)
 The Car (1978) - Mr. Mackey

Television

 I Spy (1955) - French Officer
 Peter Gunn (1959) - Frank Kelly
 Have Gun - Will Travel (1959) - Howard Gorman
 The Untouchables (1959-1963) - Harry Tazik / Tony Genna / Birch Henchman (uncredited)
 Dr Kildare (1963) - Albert Case
 The Alfred Hitchcock Hour  (1963, The 31st of February) - The Psychiatrist
 Rawhide (1964) - Fred Adams
 Combat (1964) - Tech Sgt. Martinez
 I Spy (1965-1966) - Patterson / Capt. Richards
 Bonanza (1966) - Martinez (Episode: "To Kill a Buffalo")
 Gunsmoke (1966) - Jed Bailey / Wales
 Get Smart (1967) - Carlos
 Here Come the Brides (1970) - Barney Alton ("Another Game in Town")
 Alias Smith and Jones (1971-1972) - Bartender / Mattson / Bookie / Parson
 Columbo (1972) - Sergeant
 Ironside (1972) - Taxi Driver Jones
 Kojak (1973-1974) - Pullian / Irwin David
 Charlie's Angels (1978) - Cooperman

References

Further reading

External links
 
 

1922 births
1978 deaths
American male film actors
American male stage actors
American male television actors
Male actors from New York City
Deaths from lung cancer in California
20th-century American male actors
Method actors